Omar Tyrell Crawford Richards (born 15 February 1998) is an English professional footballer who plays as a left back or a wing back for Premier League club Nottingham Forest.

Club career

Reading
Richards played for local teams before he joined Fulham at age 10. Following his release from Fulham Under-16, he signed his first professional contract with Reading under academy manager Eamonn Dolan in July 2016. Reading's academy coach, David Dodds, converted him from a left-sided forward into a left-back.

Richards made his debut for Reading under coach Jaap Stam on the opening day of the 2017–18 season, coming on as a 59th minute substitute for Jón Daði Böðvarsson following Tiago Ilori's red card. On 30 November 2017, Reading announced that Richards had signed a new deal with club until 2021. He scored his first professional goal in a 1–1 draw with Nottingham Forest on 20 February 2018.

Bayern Munich
On 27 May 2021, Bayern Munich announced the signing of Richards to a four-year contract as a free agent once his Reading contract expired in June 2021.

Nottingham Forest

On 10 July 2022, recently promoted Premier League club Nottingham Forest announced the signing of Richards on a four-year contract for an €8,500,000 transfer fee.

International career
Born in England, Richards is of Jamaican descent and has expressed an interest in representing the Jamaica national team. On 30 August 2019, Richards received his first international call-up with a place in the  England U21 squad. He eventually made his U21 debut on 11 October 2019 as a substitute during a 2–2 draw against Slovenia in Maribor.

Personal life
Richards was born in Lewisham; where he grew up with his mother, a single parent, and two brothers.

Career statistics

Honours
Bayern Munich
Bundesliga: 2021–22
DFL-Supercup: 2021

References

External links
Profile at the Nottingham Forest F.C. website
 

1998 births
Living people
English footballers
England under-21 international footballers
English sportspeople of Jamaican descent
FC Bayern Munich footballers
Reading F.C. players
Premier League players
Nottingham Forest F.C. players
Bundesliga players
English Football League players
Footballers from the London Borough of Lewisham
Association football defenders
Black British sportspeople
English expatriate footballers
English expatriate sportspeople in Germany
Expatriate footballers in Germany